Limerick City–Limerick East was a parliamentary constituency represented in Dáil Éireann, the lower house of the Irish parliament or Oireachtas from 1921 to 1923. The constituency elected 4 deputies (Teachtaí Dála, commonly known as TDs) to the Dáil, on the system of proportional representation by means of the single transferable vote (PR-STV).

History and boundaries 
The constituency was created by the Government of Ireland Act 1920 and first used at the 1921 general election to the House of Commons of Southern Ireland, whose members formed the 2nd Dáil. It covered Limerick City and the eastern parts of County Limerick.

It succeeded the United Kingdom House of Commons constituencies of Limerick City and East Limerick which in 1918 were used to elect the members of the 1st Dáil.

It was abolished under the Electoral Act 1923, when it was replaced by the new Limerick constituency which was first used in the 1923 general election for the members of the 4th Dáil.

TDs

Elections 
At both the 1921 general election and the 1922 general election, the number of candidates in Limerick City–Limerick East exactly matched the number of seats. There was therefore no ballot in the constituency on either occasion, and all candidates were returned without a contest.

1922 general election

1921 general election 

|}

See also
Dáil constituencies
Politics of the Republic of Ireland
Historic Dáil constituencies
Elections in the Republic of Ireland

References

External links 
Oireachtas Members Database

Historic constituencies in County Limerick
Dáil constituencies in the Republic of Ireland (historic)
1921 establishments in Ireland
1923 disestablishments in Ireland
Constituencies established in 1921
Constituencies disestablished in 1923